Vice Admiral Ralph Lucien Hennessy DSC, CD (4 September 1918 – 13 June 2014) was a senior officer in the Royal Canadian Navy.

Naval career 
Hennessy joined the Royal Canadian Navy as a cadet in 1935. He went on to be Deputy Chief of Naval Personnel in 1960, Flag Officer Atlantic Coast in 1963 and Chair of Military Manpower in 1964. His last role was as Principal Naval Adviser from 1966 to 1968.

Awards and decorations 
Hennessy's personal awards and decorations include the following:

References 

Canadian admirals
Canadian recipients of the Distinguished Service Cross (United Kingdom)
Canadian military personnel of World War II
1918 births
2014 deaths